Nutmeg is a spice, usually obtained from the plant Myristica fragrans. It may also refer to:

Living things

Plants
 Agathophyllum aromaticum, a shrub sometimes known as clove nutmeg or Madagascar nutmeg
 Atherosperma moschatum, an Australian tree sometimes known as plume nutmeg or New Holland nutmeg
 Carya myristiciformis, a species of hickory tree also known as nutmeg hickory
 Leycesteria formosa, a shrub sometimes known as flowering nutmeg or Himalaya nutmeg
 Monodora myristica a tropical tree sometimes known as calabash nutmeg, African nutmeg or Jamaican nutmeg
 Myristica argentea, Papua nutmeg, Guinea nutmeg, Norse nutmeg or Macassar nutmeg
 Myristica fragrans, fragrant nutmeg, the usual source of the spice
 Myristica malabarica, Malabar nutmeg, or Bombay nutmeg
 Torreya, a genus of conifers also known as nutmeg yew
 Montreal melon, sometimes called "nutmeg melon"

Animals
 Nutmeg snails, a common name of the genus Cancellariidae
 Common nutmeg, a species of nutmeg snail
 Nutmeg (moth)
 Scaly-breasted munia, also known as the nutmeg mannikin

Music
 Nutmeg (band), an indie-rock band from Sweden
 The Nutmegs, a doo wop group from the 1950s
 "Nutmeg", a track on Ghostface's album Supreme Clientele
 "Nutmeg", a track on Das Racist's mixtape Shut Up, Dude
 "Nutmeg", a track on Infected Mushroom's album Return to the Sauce

Other uses
 Nutmeg 24, a Canadian sailboat design
 Nutmeg (cat), the former longest-lived cat
Nutmeg (association football), a football technique
 Nutmeg (company), an investment company based in London
 Nutmeg oil, a volatile oil derived from nutmeg
 Nutmeg (train), a former passenger train of the New York, New Haven and Hartford Railroad

See also
"The Nutmeg State", a nickname for Connecticut
 Nutmegger, a nickname for people from the state of Connecticut